Obsessed (also known as Hitting Home) is a 1987 Canadian drama film. The story is based on a novel by Tom Alderman.

Plot 
A Canadian mother and businesswoman Dinah Middleton (Keane) is devastated when her teenage son, Alex (Anderson), is killed by a hit-and-run driver. When the police fail to turn up any suspects, she turns private detective to track the killer down. She traces the murderer to New York City, only to discover that the crime is not covered by the extradition treaty between Canada and the US. She becomes obsessed with bringing the criminal to justice.

Recognition 
 1989
 Genie Award for Best Performance by an Actress in a Supporting Role - Colleen Dewhurst - Won
 Genie Award for Best Achievement in Overall Sound - Don White, Gabor Vadnay, Michael Liotta, Joe Grimaldi - Nominated
 Genie Award for Best Performance by an Actress in a Leading Role - Kerrie Keane - Nominated
 Genie Award for Best Adapted Screenplay - Douglas Bowie, Robin Spry - Nominated
 1988
 Montreal World Film Festival Best Canadian Film - Robin Spry - Won

References

External links 
 

1987 television films
1987 films
Canadian drama television films
1987 drama films
Films based on Canadian novels
Films shot in Montreal
Films directed by Robin Spry
French-language Canadian films
1980s English-language films
1980s Canadian films